The Inwood–207th Street station (formerly Washington Heights–207th Street) is the northern terminal station of the IND Eighth Avenue Line of the New York City Subway. Located at the intersection of 207th Street and Broadway in the Manhattan neighborhood of Inwood, near Inwood Hill Park, it is served by the A train at all times.

History
This underground station opened as Washington Heights–207th Street. The station opened on September 10, 1932, as the northern terminal of the city-operated Independent Subway System (IND)'s initial segment, the Eighth Avenue Line between Chambers Street and 207th Street.

This station was renovated in the late 1990s, and the contract for the project's design was awarded in May 1994. Elevators were added to the station at some point, making it compliant with the Americans with Disabilities Act of 1990.

Station layout 

This underground station has a single island platform between the two tracks, which end at bumper blocks just north of the platform. To the immediate south is an interlocking made up of a diamond crossover that allows trains to get to the correct track, and then proceed to share the right of way with the 207th Street Yard leads to Dyckman Street, which is the next station south. The mezzanine and street elevator shaft includes artwork titled At the Start...At Long Last by Sheila Levrant de Bretteville. The terminal is operated by a Dispatcher's Office at the south end, while the Interlocking Plant is controlled by the CTC located in the 207th Street Yard. The mezzanine connecting the north and south exits of the station is closed, and is used for employee facilities.

Exits
The main exit to the station consists of three street stairs and an elevator at Broadway and 207th Street. The elevator is at the northwest corner while one stair leads from the other three corners. The north exit to the station has two street stairs to either northern corner of Broadway, Isham Street, and 211th Street.

There is also a closed exit that led to the northwest corner of 207th Street and Broadway. This stair was located inside a building and had been closed after it was severely damaged after a fire. Several turns were required to access the staircase, creating poor sight-lines. In June 1994, the MTA Board approved a plan to permanently close the entrance, allowing the passageway to be sealed with brick-and-mortar at either end. At this point, the entrance had been closed for several years. It was estimated that the entrance would have been used by 400 daily passengers. A public meeting was held in May 1994, along with proposed station access changes at other stations. The elevator entrance is located near this old staircase.

Nearby points of interest 
 Inwood Hill Park
 Isham Park

References

External links 

 
 nycsubway.org – At the Start... At Long Last Artwork by Sheila Levrant de Bretteville (1999)
 Station Reporter – A Lefferts
 Station Reporter – A Rockaway
 MTA's Arts For Transit – Inwood–207th Street (IND Eighth Avenue Line)
 The Subway Nut — Inwood–207th Street Pictures

 207th Street entrance from Google Maps Street View
 Isham Street/211th Street entrance from Google Maps Street View
 Platform from Google Maps Street View

207
New York City Subway stations in Manhattan
New York City Subway terminals
Railway stations in the United States opened in 1932
Broadway (Manhattan)
Inwood, Manhattan
U.S. Route 9
1932 establishments in New York City